The 1968 Oklahoma State Cowboys baseball team represented the Oklahoma State University in the 1968 NCAA University Division baseball season.  The team was coached by Chet Bryan in his 4th year at Oklahoma State.

The Cowboys won the District V playoff to advance to the College World Series, where they were defeated by the Southern Illinois Salukis.

Roster

Schedule

! style="" | Regular Season
|- valign="top" 

|- bgcolor="#ffcccc"
| 1 || March 23 || at  || Kyle Baseball Field • College Station, Texas || 0–4 || 0–1 || –
|- bgcolor="#ffcccc"
| 2 || March 23 || at Texas A&M || Kyle Baseball Field • College Station, Texas || 2–3 || 0–2 || –
|- bgcolor="#ffcccc"
| 3 || March 25 || at  || Cougar Field • Houston, Texas || 5–6 || 0–3 || –
|- bgcolor="#ccffcc"
| 4 || March 26 || at Houston || Couagr Field • Houston, Texas || 2–1 || 1–3 || –
|- bgcolor="#ccffcc"
| 5 || March 27 || at Houston || Cougar Field • Houston, Texas || 9–1 || 2–3 || –
|- bgcolor="#ccffcc"
| 6 || March 28 || at Houston || Cougar Field • Houston, Texas || 6–4 || 3–3 || –
|- bgcolor="#ffcccc"
| 7 || March 29 || at Houston || Cougar Field • Houston, Texas || 3–4 || 3–4 || –
|-

|- bgcolor="#ccffcc"
| 8 || April 5 || at  || Cap Timm Field • Ames, Iowa || 9–2 || 4–4 || 1–0
|- bgcolor="#ccffcc"
| 9 || April 5 || at Iowa State || Cap Timm Field • Ames, Iowa || 4–3 || 5–4 || 2–0
|- bgcolor="#ccffcc"
| 10 || April 6 || at Iowa State || Cap Timm Field • Ames, Iowa || 22–4 || 6–4 || 3–0
|- bgcolor="#ccffcc"
| 11 || April 12 ||  || Unknown • Stillwater, Oklahoma || 2–1 || 7–4 || 4–0
|- bgcolor="#ccffcc"
| 12 || April 12 || Colorado || Unknown • Stillwater, Oklahoma || 3–1 || 8–4 || 5–0
|- bgcolor="#ccffcc"
| 13 || April 13 || Colorado || Unknown • Stillwater, Oklahoma || 5–1 || 9–4 || 6–0
|- bgcolor="#ffcccc"
| 14 || April 26 || at  || KSU Baseball Stadium • Manhattan, Kansas || 4–5 || 9–5 || 6–1
|- bgcolor="#ffcccc"
| 15 || April 26 || at Kansas State || KSU Baseball Stadium • Manhattan, Kansas || 2–3 || 9–6 || 6–2
|- bgcolor="#ccffcc"
| 16 || April 27 || at Kansas State || KSU Baseball Stadium • Manhattan, Kansas || 10–2 || 10–6 || 7–2
|-

|- bgcolor="#ccffcc"
| 17 || May 3 ||  || Unknown • Stillwater, Oklahoma || 10–1 || 11–6 || 8–2
|- bgcolor="#ffcccc"
| 18 || May 3 || Kansas || Unknown • Stillwater, Oklahoma || 4–5 || 11–7 || 8–3
|- bgcolor="#ccffcc"
| 19 || May 4 || Kansas || Unknown • Stillwater, Oklahoma || 14–4 || 12–7 || 9–3
|- bgcolor="#ccffcc"
| 20 || May 10 || at  || Husker Diamond • Lincoln, Nebraska || 5–1 || 13–7 || 10–3
|- bgcolor="#ccffcc"
| 21 || May 10 || at Nebraska || Husker Diamond • Lincoln, Nebraska || 5–0 || 14–7 || 11–3
|- bgcolor="#ccffcc"
| 22 || May 11 || at Nebraska || Husker Diamond • Lincoln, Nebraska || 4–0 || 15–7 || 12–3
|- bgcolor="#ccffcc"
| 23 || May 17 || at  || Simmons Field • Columbia, Missouri || 5–3 || 16–7 || 13–3
|- bgcolor="#ccffcc"
| 24 || May 17 || at Missouri || Simmons Field • Columbia, Missouri || 10–3 || 17–7 || 14–3
|- bgcolor="#ccffcc"
| 25 || May 18 || at Missouri || Simmons Field • Columbia, Missouri || 4–1 || 18–7 || 15–3
|-

|-
|-
! style="" | Postseason
|- valign="top" 

|- bgcolor="#ccffcc"
| 26 || May 29 ||  || Unknown • Stillwater, Oklahoma || 13–1 || 19–7 || 15–3
|- bgcolor="#ccffcc"
| 27 || May 29 || Bradley || Unknown • Stillwater, Oklahoma || 2–3 || 20–7 || 15–3
|-

|- bgcolor="#ccffcc"
| 28 || June 10 || vs Texas || Omaha Municipal Stadium • Omaha, Nebraska || 8–5 || 21–7 || 15–3
|- bgcolor="#ffcccc"
| 29 || June 13 || vs Southern California || Omaha Municipal Stadium • Omaha, Nebraska || 5–6 || 21–8 || 15–3
|- bgcolor="#ffcccc"
| 30 || June 13 || vs Southern Illinois || Omaha Municipal Stadium • Omaha, Nebraska || 1–7 || 21–9 || 15–3
|-

Awards and honors 
Steve Houck
All-Big Eight Conference

Danny Thompson
First Team All-American American Baseball Coaches Association
All-Big Eight Conference
College World Series All-Tournament Team

Wayne Weatherly
All-Big Eight Conference
College World Series All-Tournament Team

References

Oklahoma State Cowboys baseball seasons
Oklahoma State Cowboys baseball
College World Series seasons
Oklahoma State
Big Eight Conference baseball champion seasons